Timmins  is a surname which originated in a number of different countries. It is found mainly in Great Britain, Ireland, America, Canada, Australia and New Zealand. In England, the largest concentration of the name exists in the West Midlands; variants of the name include Timmings and Timmons. An early example of the name can be found in the Subsidy Rolls of Sussex (1332) - Richard Tymyng. In Ireland, it is mainly an anglecisation of the Gaelic surnames Toimín from Leinster and Ó Tiomáin from Ulster.

Notable people with the surname
Cali Timmins (born 1963), Canadian actress 
Charlie Timmins (1922–2010), English footballer
Conor Timmins (born 1998), Canadian ice hockey player
Margo Timmins (born 1961), Canadian musician 
Michael Timmins (born 1959), Canadian musician 
Noah Timmins (1867–1936), Canadian mining pioneer
Peter Timmins (born 1965), Canadian musician 
Romy Timmins (born 1989), Australian rules footballer  
Sam Timmins (born 1997), New Zealand basketball player 
Sammy Timmins (1879–1956), English footballer 
Samuel Timmins (1826–1902), English scholar and antiquarian 
Shaun Timmins (born 1976), Australian rugby league footballer

Fictional characters
 Stingray Timmins, a character in the Australian soap opera Neighbours
 "A Little Dinner at Timmins's", a novel by William Makepeace Thackeray

See also
Timmons

References

External links
 "The Timmins One-Name Study"
 "The Timmins DNA Project"

English-language surnames
Surnames of English origin